Viktor Oleksandrovych Hrachov (born 17 September 1956 in Dzerzhynsk) is a retired Ukrainian football player and currently a manager.

Career statistics

Club

Honours
 Soviet Cup winner: 1980, 1983
 UEFA Cup Winners' Cup 1983–84 top scorer
 IFA Shield: 1985

International career
Hrachov played his only game for USSR on 15 May 1984 in a friendly against Finland.

References

  Profile

1956 births
Living people
People from Toretsk
Soviet footballers
Soviet Union international footballers
Ukrainian footballers
Soviet expatriate footballers
Ukrainian expatriate footballers
Expatriate footballers in Hungary
Soviet Top League players
Ukrainian Premier League players
Nemzeti Bajnokság I players
FC Oryol players
FK Köpetdag Aşgabat players
FC Torpedo Moscow players
FC Shakhtar Donetsk players
FC Spartak Moscow players
Budapesti VSC footballers
Debreceni VSC players
Ukrainian football managers
Ukrainian Premier League managers
FC Shakhtar-2 Donetsk managers
FC Shakhtar-3 Donetsk managers
SC Tavriya Simferopol managers
Ukrainian expatriate sportspeople in Hungary
Soviet expatriate sportspeople in Hungary
Association football forwards
Sportspeople from Donetsk Oblast